The Hottest Show on Earth is a Canadian short documentary film released in 1977. Directed by Terence Macartney-Filgate, Derek Lamb and Wolf Koenig for the National Film Board of Canada, the film centred on the environmental and financial benefits of efficient building insulation, using both animation and humour to engage viewers on a potentially dry and boring topic.

The film won the Canadian Film Award for Best Short Documentary at the 29th Canadian Film Awards in 1978.

References

External links

1977 films
1977 documentary films
Canadian short documentary films
English-language Canadian films
1970s Canadian films
National Film Board of Canada documentaries
National Film Board of Canada short films
Best Short Documentary Film Genie and Canadian Screen Award winners
Canadian animated documentary films